FC6 may refer to:
Fedora (operating system)
 FC6: an EEG electrode site according to the 10-20 system
 Far Cry 6